The Haitian least gecko (Sphaerodactylus asterulus) is a species of lizard in the family Sphaerodactylidae . It is endemic to Haiti.

References

Sphaerodactylus
Reptiles of Haiti
Endemic fauna of Haiti
Reptiles described in 1980
Taxa named by Albert Schwartz (zoologist)